Amaurobius phaeacus is a species of spiders in the family Amaurobiidae, found in Albania, North Macedonia and Greece.

References

phaeacus
Spiders of Europe
Fauna of Albania
Fauna of Greece
Spiders described in 1998